Rimantė Kunickaitė (born 18 April 1993) is a Lithuanian footballer who played as a midfielder for A Lyga club FK Kauno Žalgiris. She has been a member of the Lithuania women's national team.

References

1993 births
Living people
Women's association football midfielders
Lithuanian women's footballers
Lithuania women's international footballers
Gintra Universitetas players